Im Do-hwa (born Kim Chan-mi [김찬미] on June 19, 1996), simply known as Chanmi, is a South Korean singer and actress. She is best known as a member of the South Korean girl group AOA.

Biography 
Chanmi was born on June 19, 1996, in Gumi, South Korea. She was enrolled into dancing school at a young age, and performed on the streets of Gumi. She and her two sisters, Kyung-mi and Hye-mi, were raised by their mother after their parents divorced when Chanmi was in elementary school. Her mother ran a hair salon so Chanmi decided to become an idol to help her mother's financial situation. She was recruited by FNC Entertainment and became an FNC trainee during middle school.

Career

Career with AOA and AOA Cream

On July 30, 2012, Chanmi made her debut as a member of AOA on Mnet's M! Countdown with their debut single album, Angels' Story and the title track "Elvis". AOA has released four EPs and ten singles in total.

Chanmi is also part of sub-unit AOA Cream together with Yuna and Hyejeong. The sub-unit released their first teaser on February 1, 2016.
The music video teaser for title track "I'm Jelly Baby" was released on February 4, 2016.
AOA Cream released their title track together with the MV on February 12, 2016.

As soloist and actress
Chanmi has participated in multiple solo competitions and has been recognized for her dancing and fitness skills. She made it into the final round of MBC Music's Idol Dance Battle D-Style in 2014, and performed in both a solo dance stage and a joint dance stage in MBC's DMC Festival in 2015. She also competed in KBS's Muscle Queen Project in 2016.

The singer made her debut as an actress with her first lead role in the web drama What's Up With These Kids? as Geum Hye Ra. She acted alongside VIXX members N and Hongbin. The drama was aired on November 16, 2016.

In March 2017, it was revealed that Chanmi is going to star in an idol actor survival variety show called I Am An Actor. The first episode was aired in April. At the conclusion of the show, Chanmi placed first and won a role in an upcoming film entitled Lookism.

In 2019, Chanmi together with Shin Hye-jeong and Seo Yu-na will take part in Lifetime's reality program AOA DaSaDanang Heart Attack Danang where the members will travel to Danang, Vietnam for an adventure.

In June 2019, Chanmi was cast in web drama Love Formula 11M as Ji-yoon. In November 2019 she was cast in MBC's new pilot variety show House of Sharing. The show will be broadcast in early December.

On June 29, 2021, Chamni was confirmed to co-star alongside VIXX's Hyuk in the upcoming rom-com movie A Different Girl.

Personal life 
On  April 25, 2022, she changed her last name from Kim to Im, following her mother's surname.

Discography

Filmography

Film

Television series

Variety shows

Web shows

Theater

References

External links 

 

	

AOA (group) members
1996 births
Living people
People from Gumi, North Gyeongsang
FNC Entertainment artists
K-pop singers
South Korean female idols
South Korean women pop singers
South Korean television actresses
South Korean television personalities
South Korean dance musicians
Japanese-language singers of South Korea
Mandarin-language singers of South Korea